Satveh (also Romanized as Saţveh; also known as Sadfeh, Satfar, and Satva) is a village in Torud Rural District, in the Central District of Shahrud County, Semnan Province, Iran. At the 2006 census, its population was 1,009, in 219 families.

References 

Populated places in Shahrud County